Jessie Keppie (1868-1951) was an artist from Glasgow, Scotland, described as one of the "leading women proponents of the Glasgow Style".

Biography
Keppie was born in 1868. Her mother was named Helen Cuthbertson (born Hopkins) while her father, James Keppie imported and sold tobacco. In 1888 she was the fourth member of her Glasgow family to study at the Glasgow School of Art following her siblings. Jane, Helen and John Keppie. She created a Persian carpet which took a silver medal in the National Competition during her second year of study in 1889.

In 1902, Keppie took part in the Scottish National Exhibition in Edinburgh. She performed in an allegorical and historical Arthurian masque created by Jessie M King and Mrs Allan D Mainds. Other participants in this event were the artists James Craig Annan, Agnes Raeburn, and Margaret Macdonald. Also in 1902, Keppie joined the Glasgow Lady Artists' Club and served as their Treasurer during 1922 and as the Club's President from 1928 to 1931.

Keppie was a member of the informal group of artists known as "The Immortals", which also included Agnes Raeburn, Margaret Macdonald Mackintosh, Jessie Newbery, Ruby Pickering, Katharine Cameron, Janet Aitken and Frances McNair.

She was a suffragist, subscribing to the Glasgow and West of Scotland Association for Women's Suffrage.

Personal life
Keppie is reported to have been engaged to Charles Rennie Mackintosh, who broke off the engagement in favour of a relationship with Margaret Macdonald Mackintosh. Others have suggested that it was not an engagement, rather an informal "understanding".

She died in Prestwick in 1951.

Works
 Autumn (1894)
Pansies (1895)
 Dog Roses (1899)
A sunlit courtyard, Generalife, Grenada (1909)
 Chateau Gilliard
 Gathering Firewood
The budding rose above the rose full blown
Pink geraniums and a butterfly
Pink carnations
Honeysuckke
Fuchsia
Summer garden
Ostend
The road to the farm

References

1868 births
1951 deaths
19th-century Scottish women artists
20th-century Scottish women artists
Alumni of the Glasgow School of Art
Artists from Glasgow